= Moses Mabhida Railway Station =

Railway station in Durban, South Africa

Metrorail

Overview
- Locale: Durban, South Africa
- Transit type: Commuter rail
System map
kwaMashu - Umlazi Line

Moses Mabhida Railway Station is a train station in Durban, that was built in 2010, when South Africa hosted the Soccer World Cup. Costing R140 million, the Passenger Rail Association of South Africa (PRASA) commissioned Grinaker-LTA to complete the “PeoplesTrain” within 10 months. This “Rail Commuter Station” connects kwaMashu–Umlazi Line and connects directly to the Moses Mabhida stadium. Soccer fans, instead of walking 1 km from Durban Station, are able to access the stadium directly. Following the 2010 World Cup, PRASA makes additional trains available for fans to attend important soccer matches.

== Non-operational Stations in KwaMashu ==
The railway lines in KwaMashu, Durban, remain largely non-operational due to extensive damage from the devastating 2022 floods, and cable theft and station vandalism have delayed repairs.
